Bostan (also Romanized as Bostān) is a village in Fathabad Rural District, in the Central District of Baft County, Kerman Province, Iran. At the 2006 census, its population was 76, in 17 families.

References 

Populated places in Baft County